Flight 308 may refer to:

Southeast Airlines Flight 308, crashed on 8 January 1959
Pacific Air Lines Flight 308, crashed on October 29, 1959

0308